The 1st Nongshim Cup was the inaugural edition of the team Go tournament consisting of five players each from China, Japan and South Korea. The tournament began on 16 December 1999 in Shanghai and finished on 28 March 2000. On Lee Chang-ho and Ma Xiaochun met in the final, with Lee defeating China's top player and leading Korea to their first of six straight Nongshim Cup titles.

Teams
Preliminaries were held in Korea, while Japan and China sent pre-selected teams. Players listed in order that they appeared for their respective teams.

 China
Qiu Jun
Luo Xihe
Wang Lei
Chang Hao
Ma Xiaochun

 Japan
Yamashita Keigo
Kudo Norio
Yoda Norimoto
Yamada Kimio
Cho Sonjin

 South Korea
Mok Jin-seok
Kim Yeong-sam
Cho Hunhyun
Yoo Changhyuk
Lee Chang-ho

Tournament
Mok Jin-seok of Korea defeated Yamashita Keigo in the first game. He would go on to defeat China representative Qiu Jun before losing to Japanese player Kudo Norio on 19 December. Luo Xihe beat Kudo Norio before the tournament moved to Tokyo.

Luo lost to Kim Yeong-sam of Korea, who then lost to Japan's Yoda Norimoto. Korea's Cho Hunhyun defeated Yoda after the Japanese representative eliminated China's Wang Lei from the tournament. The third and final stage moved to Seoul. Korea had three players left (including Hunhyun), while China (Chang Hao and Ma Xiaochun) and Japan (Cho Sonjin and Yamada Kimio) were left with two players each.

Cho Hunhyun would lose the opening match of the third stage to Chang, who then stringed together two more victories by defeating Yamada (Japan) and Yoo Changhyuk (Korea). Cho Sonjin of Japan defeated Chang, but then lost his next match against Korea's Lee Chang-ho.

First stage

Second stage

Third stage

References

Nongshim Cup